Teresa A.H. Djuric is a retired United States Air Force brigadier general. Her last assignment was deputy director, Space and Intelligence Office, Office of the Under Secretary of Defense for Acquisition, Technology and Logistics, The Pentagon, Washington, D.C.

Military career
Teresa Anne Hudachek Djuric is the daughter of U.S. Army Major General John W. Hudachek and Anne (Hamilton) Hudachek. She was commissioned in 1983 through Officer Training School. She has operated space systems at three space wings and Headquarters 14th Air Force. In 2004, she deployed to Southwest Asia as director of space forces for operations Enduring Freedom and Iraqi Freedom. She has commanded at the squadron, group and wing levels, and has served on staffs at the Air Force Personnel Center, United States Strategic Command and Headquarters United States Air Force. Prior to her final assignment, she was Commander, Jeanne M. Holm Center for Officer Accessions and Citizen Development, Maxwell Air Force Base, Alabama.

Post retirement
Djuric is the commandant of cadets for the Virginia Women's Institute for Leadership (VWIL) and special assistant to the president at Mary Baldwin College, effective October 1, 2013.

Education
1983 Bachelor of Science degree in computer science, University of Mary Washington, Fredericksburg, Virginia
1983 Officer Training School, Lackland Air Force Base, Texas
1987 Squadron Officer School, Maxwell Air Force Base, Alabama
1994 Master of Arts degree in Curriculum & Instruction, University of Colorado, Colorado Springs, Colorado
1996 Air Command and Staff College, Maxwell Air Force Base, Alabama
1999 Air War College, by correspondence
2001 Master of Strategic Studies degree, Army War College, Carlisle Barracks, Carlisle, Pennsylvania
2006 Joint and Combined Warfighting School, Joint Forces Staff College, Norfolk, Virginia

Assignments
 October 1983 – August 1987, satellite operations officer, North American Aerospace Defense Command, Cheyenne Mountain Air Force Station, Colorado
 August 1987 – November 1988, crew commander, 5th Space Warning Squadron, Woomera, South Australia
 November 1988 – January 1992, flight commander, Squadron Officer School, Maxwell Air Force Base, Alabama
 January 1992 – May 1994, section commander, 21st Crew Training Squadron, Peterson Air Force Base, Colorado
 May 1994 – August 1995, flight commander, 21st Operations Support Squadron, Peterson Air Force Base, Colorado
 July 1995 – June 1996, student, Air Command and Staff College, Maxwell Air Force Base, Alabama
 June 1996 – March 1998, section chief, division chief and executive officer, Assignments Directorate, Air Force Personnel Command, Randolph Air Force Base, Texas
 March 1998 – June 2000, commander, 614th Space Operations Squadron, Vandenberg Air Force Base, California
 June 2000 – June 2001, student, Army War College, Carlisle Barracks, Pennsylvania
 July 2001 – June 2003, U.S. Strategic Command representative to U.S. Pacific Command, Camp H.M. Smith, Hawaii
 June 2003 – May 2005, commander, 21st Operations Group, Peterson Air Force Base, Colorado (April 2004 – August 2004, director of space forces, U.S. Central Command Air Forces, Southwest Asia)
 May 2005 – September 2006, chief, Space Superiority Division, Deputy Chief of Staff for Strategic Plans and Programs, Headquarters U.S. Air Force, Washington, D.C.
 September 2006 – May 2007, vice commander, 30th Space Wing, Vandenberg Air Force Base, California
 May 2007 – June 2008, commander, 50th Space Wing, Schriever Air Force Base, Colorado
 June 2008 – October 2010, commander, Jeanne M. Holm Center for Officer Accessions and Citizen Development, Maxwell Air Force Base, Alabama
 October 2010 – September 2013, deputy director, Space and Intelligence Office, Office of the Under Secretary of Defense for Acquisition, Technology and Logistics, The Pentagon, Washington, D.C.

Awards and decorations

Other achievements
2005 Gen. Jerome O'Malley Distinguished Space Leadership Award

Effective dates of promotion

References

United States Air Force generals
Women in the United States Air Force
Recipients of the Legion of Merit
United States Air Force personnel of the War in Afghanistan (2001–2021)
United States Air Force personnel of the Iraq War
University of Mary Washington alumni
University of Colorado Colorado Springs alumni
Year of birth missing (living people)
Living people
Recipients of the Defense Superior Service Medal
Women in the Iraq War
American people of Serbian descent